The Submarine Caper (later retitled Deadly Chase) is the 68th title of the Hardy Boys Mystery Stories, written by Franklin W. Dixon.  It was published by Wanderer Books in 1981.

Plot summary

On a visit to Germany the Hardy brothers investigate the theft of plans for a newly invented submarine and the mysterious disappearance of valuable coins and paintings.

The Hardy Boys books
1981 American novels
1981 children's books
Novels set in Germany